Namayan is a barangay in the city of Mandaluyong, Philippines. It is located in the western part of the city near the border with Santa Ana, Manila and Kasilawan and Carmona, Makati, separated from them by the Pasig River. According to the 2020 census, it has a population of 7,670 people.

Namayan was the center of a pre-Hispanic kingdom that covered much of the modern city of Manila and surrounding cities in southern and eastern Metro Manila.

Education 
 Doña Basilisa Yangco Elementary School

Landmarks 
 Namayan Church
 Namayan Park
 Most Sacred Heart of Jesus Sub-Parish Church

See also 
Administrative divisions of Metro Manila

References

Barangays of Metro Manila
Mandaluyong